The Barbas River is a river of Ciales, Puerto Rico.

See also
List of rivers of Puerto Rico
 Cialitos River

References

External links
 USGS Hydrologic Unit Map – Caribbean Region (1974)
 Rios de Puerto Rico
 Aquí está Puerto Rico - Ciales 

Rivers of Puerto Rico